Julia Hammett-Jamart is a scholar and filmmaker. She forged her career in the Australian film industry, working firstly in film and television production, where she directed and produced projects for national broadcast, before expanding her professional engagement to include screen policy and education.

Career 

Her first documentary, The Sound of Therapy, focused on the use of music therapy with developmentally delayed children. It was screened nationally by the Australian public broadcaster, Special Broadcasting Service, received extensive media attention and earned her a place at the Australian Film, Television and Radio School. She subsequently made numerous short films, including Surrender, which achieved theatrical release with AFI Distribution and received positive critical attention within Australia and at international film festivals.

From 2004 to 2008, Hammett-Jamart held senior policy positions within the Australian government's film funding agencies (Policy Officer, Manager Governance and Strategic Planning). She was a member of the Transition Team responsible for overseeing the merger of the Film Finance Corporation Australia, the Australian Film Commission and Film Australia into the current single agency, Screen Australia.

Since obtaining her PhD in Media and Communications, she has published numerous articles on screen policy and presented papers at various international conferences and institutions, including the US Society for Cinema and Media Studies (SCMS) and the European Network for Cinema and Media Studies (NECS). She has delivered guest lectures at many leading European institutions including King's College London the British Institute in Paris, the University of Copenhagen, and the Institut National de l'Histoire de l'Art and has held visiting fellowships at the Université Paris III (UFR Arts et Medias) and the University of London. Hammett-Jamart is known in particular for her research into policy implementation on international co-productions.

In 2009 she relocated to France, where she co-founded the Coproduction Research Network. Her most recent publication is the collected volume European Film and Television Co-production: Policy and Practice.

Publications

References

External links
 Web page at International Coproduction Research Network
 Web page at Academia
 Web page at imdb

Australian women film producers
Australian women academics
Australian academics
Living people
1969 births
Australian writers
20th-century Australian women writers
21st-century Australian women writers